David Ward is a British diplomat who works for the United Kingdom's Foreign and Commonwealth Office. He is currently the British High Commissioner to Samoa.  He previously served as the British High Commissioner to Solomon Islands and non-resident British High Commissioner to the Republic of Vanuatu and the Republic of Nauru.

Posts held 
Source:
1992: Joined Foreign and Commonwealth Office
1992–1993: Foreign and Commonwealth Office, Assistant Desk Officer, EU Department (External)
1994–1995: Full-time language training (Japanese)
1995–1998: Tokyo, Second Secretary (Political)
1998–2001: Foreign and Commonwealth Office, Head of Institutions Section, Common Foreign and Security Policy Department
2002–2005: Kathmandu, Deputy Head of Mission
2006–2009: Beijing, Deputy Counsellor (Political)
2010–2010: Foreign and Commonwealth Office, Head of Finance Briefing Unit
2010–2011: Foreign and Commonwealth Office, Senior Strategy Adviser, Policy Unit
2011–2012: Tripoli, Deputy Head of Mission
2012–2012: Foreign and Commonwealth Office, Silver Manager, Olympic Coordination Centre
2012–2012: Athens, Counsellor (Political)
2013–2014: Lashkar Gah, Deputy Head of Mission, Provincial Reconstruction Team
2014–2016: Eritrea, Her Majesty's Ambassador
2016–2019: Solomon Islands, High Commissioner
2016–2019: Vanuatu, High Commissioner (non-resident)
2016–2019: Nauru, High Commissioner (non-resident)
2019–present: Samoa, High Commissioner

See also 
British High Commission
Diplomatic service
List of High Commissioners of the United Kingdom to Solomon Islands

References

Year of birth missing (living people)
Living people
20th-century British diplomats
21st-century British diplomats
High Commissioners to the Solomon Islands
Members of HM Diplomatic Service
Ambassadors of the United Kingdom to Eritrea
High Commissioners of the United Kingdom to Samoa